Crazy House is the fourth Andy Panda cartoon directed and produced by Walter Lantz. The cartoon was released on September 23, 1940.

Plot
Andy and his father seek shelter from a flood in an abandoned building, which in reality is a fun house, filled with such things as hidden practical jokes, a noisy merry-go-round and a dancing floor.

Notes
 The cartoon is recognized as Lantz's first fully independent film. In early 1940, Universal Pictures, which was facing severe financial problems, decided to cut Lantz's weekly advance, forcing the producer to shut down the studio for a while. Crazy House was produced during the closure, as Lantz managed to gain full rights to the studio's characters in case Universal had been unable to keep distributing the cartoons.

References

External links

1940 films
1940 comedy films
1940s English-language films
Films directed by Walter Lantz
Animated films about birds
Films set in abandoned houses
Walter Lantz Productions shorts
1940s American animated films
Films about bears
Films scored by Frank Marsales
Andy Panda films
1940 animated films
Universal Pictures animated short films
Animated films about animals
American comedy short films